Info TV is a Lithuanian news television station owned and operated by LNK. It started to air on 12 November 2007. The channel range is 97% of Lithuanian television users. Since 5 March 2012, Info TV airs 24/7. On 1 December 2018, the channel started broadcasting in HD, just like the other LNK Group channels - LNK, BTV and TV1.

News

Info TV demonstrates a 4 hours-long news show called "Infodiena" which is broadcasting via INFO TV, BTV and LNK TV news. "Infodiena" is displayed from Monday to Friday from 5 p.m. to 9 p.m. This show is the longest TV news programme in the Lithuanian television.

References

External links
www.infotv.lt

Television channels in Lithuania
Television channels and stations established in 2007